Light of Life is an album by the Memphis, Tennessee, funk band the Bar-Kays.

Reception

Released on Mercury Records in December 1978, this album would chart at number fifteen on the Billboard Soul Album charts.

Track listing
All tracks composed by Allen Jones, Charles Allen, Frank Thompson, Harvey Henderson, James Alexander, Lloyd Smith, Michael Beard, Winson Stewart; except where indicated
"Get Up 'N Do It"  	 3:39   	
"Shine"	3:41 	
"I Lean On You (You Lean On Me)" 	3:12 	
"Give It Up" 	4:30 	
"Love's What It's All About"	3:03 	
"I'll Dance"	3:38 	
"We're The Happiest People In The World" (Lewis Collins, Michael Toles)	3:16 	
"Are You Being Real"  	2:59 	
"Angel Eyes"	2:55

Charts

Singles

References

External links
 The Bar-Kays-Light Of Life at Discogs

1978 albums
Bar-Kays albums
Mercury Records albums